Car transporter may refer to:

 Car carrier trailer
 Flat wagon#Car transporters